Alipur is a census town in Memari I CD Block in Bardhaman Sadar South subdivision of Purba Bardhaman district in the Indian state of West Bengal.

Geography

Location

Alipur is also shown in the map of Memari I CD block in the District Census Handbook.

Urbanisation
95.54% of the population of Bardhaman Sadar South subdivision live in the rural areas. Only 4.46% of the population live in the urban areas, and that is the lowest proportion of urban population amongst the four subdivisions in Purba Bardhaman district. The map alongside presents some of the notable locations in the subdivision. All places marked in the map are linked in the larger full screen map.

Demographics
As per the 2011 Census of India, Alipur had a total population of 4,420 of which 2,247 (51%) were males and 2,173 (49%) were females. Population below 6 years was 404. The total number of literates in  Alipur was 3,285 (81.80% of the population over 6 years).

Infrastructure
As per the District Census Handbook 2011, Alipur covered an area of 1.8361 km2. Amongst the medical facilities, the nearest nursing home was 12 km away and the nearest veterinary hospital was 9 km away. It had 7 medicine shops. It had 2 primary schools. The nearest middle school was 2 km away at Mobarakpur and the secondary and senior secondary schools were 8 km away at Memari.

Transport
Alipur is off State Highway 13. Debipur railway station is located nearby.

References

Cities and towns in Purba Bardhaman district